CBC Concert was a Canadian television series which aired on CBC Television from October 31 to December 19, 1952 on Fridays at 9 PM-9:30 PM. Produced by Franz Kraemer, musical performances were broadcast from Toronto. The first episode featured folk blues singer Josh White.

External links
 Queen's University Directory of CBC Television Series (CBC Concert archived listing link via archive.org)

1952 Canadian television series debuts
1952 Canadian television series endings
CBC Television original programming
1950s Canadian music television series
Black-and-white Canadian television shows
Television shows filmed in Toronto